English singer and songwriter Mabel has released two studio albums, five extended plays, one mixtape and twenty singles. Her debut studio album, High Expectations, was released in August 2019. It peaked at number three on the UK Albums Chart and was certified gold by the British Phonographic Industry (BPI). The album included the UK top-10 singles "Don't Call Me Up", "Mad Love" and "Boyfriend".

Albums

Studio albums

Mixtapes

Extended plays

Singles

As lead artist

As featured artist

Promotional singles

Guest appearances

Music videos

Songwriting credits
 Trash - Little Mix (2021) from the greatest hits album Between Us

Notes

References

Discographies of British artists